Antiamoebin is an anti-microbial/protozoan polypeptide of fungal origin.

External links

Polypeptide antibiotics